Khaneqah (also Romanized as Khāneqāh) is a village in Akhtachi Rural District, in the Central District of Bukan County, West Azerbaijan Province, Iran. At the 2006 census, its population was 138, in 22 families.

References 

Populated places in Bukan County